Steven Roger Bast (1951–2007) was an international speedway rider from the United States.

Speedway career 
Bast was a two times North American champion, winning the AMA National Speedway Championship in 1969 and 1974. He rode in the top tier of British Speedway in 1970, riding for the Wembley Lions and gained seven US caps.

Family
His younger brother Mike Bast was a seven times North American speedway champion and his cousin Bart Bast was a US Champion.

References 

1951 births
2007 deaths
American speedway riders
Wembley Lions riders
Motorcycle racers from Los Angeles